Falcon Black Hawkins Jr. (March 16, 1927 – July 20, 2005) was a United States district judge of the United States District Court for the District of South Carolina.

Education and career

Born in Charleston, South Carolina, Hawkins graduated from North Charleston High School in 1944. He was briefly in the United States Merchant Marine before he enlisted as a private in the United States Army at the end of World War II, from 1945 to 1946. He later received a Bachelor of Science degree from The Citadel in 1958 and a Juris Doctor from the University of South Carolina School of Law in 1963. He was a veteran student at The Citadel and concurrently worked at the Charleston Naval Shipyard where he held the position of Leadingman Electronics. He was in private practice in Charleston from 1963 to 1979. He was initially in private practice with future United States Senator Ernest F. Hollings at the law firm of Hollings and Hawkins, until Hollings entered the United States Senate in 1967.

Federal judicial service

On June 5, 1979, Hawkins was nominated by President Jimmy Carter to a new seat on the United States District Court for the District of South Carolina created by 92 Stat. 1629. He was confirmed by the United States Senate on September 25, 1979, and received his commission on September 26, 1979. He served as Chief Judge from 1990 to 1993, assuming senior status on October 1, 1993. Hawkins served in that capacity until his death, at his home in Mount Pleasant, South Carolina, on July 20, 2005.

Honor

In 2003, Hawkins was awarded an honorary Doctor of Laws (Legum Doctor, LL.D.) from The Citadel.

References

Sources
 

1927 births
2005 deaths
Military personnel from Charleston, South Carolina
Judges of the United States District Court for the District of South Carolina
United States district court judges appointed by Jimmy Carter
20th-century American judges
United States Army soldiers
University of South Carolina School of Law alumni